Şükrü Naili Gökberk (1876 in Thessaloniki, Salonica Vilayet, Ottoman Empire – 26 October 1936 in Edirne, Turkey) was an officer of the Ottoman Army during World War I, reaching the rank of miralay (senior colonel / brigadier) on 1 September 1917; and of the Turkish Army during the Turkish War of Independence, reaching the rank of mirliva (Brigadier General) on 31 August 1922. He was promoted to the rank of ferik (Major General) on 30 August 1926.

He commanded the Turkish forces (3rd Corps) of the Ankara government which entered Istanbul with a ceremony on 6 October 1923, following the end of the city's occupation by the Allies of World War I, which has been marked as the Liberation Day of Istanbul (Turkish: İstanbul'un Kurtuluşu) and is commemorated every year on its anniversary.

He also served as a member of parliament at the Grand National Assembly of Turkey in Ankara for two terms, first for Kırklareli (1923) and later for Istanbul (1935).

See also
List of high-ranking commanders of the Turkish War of Independence

Sources

External links

1876 births
1936 deaths
Military personnel from Thessaloniki
People from Salonica vilayet
Macedonian Turks
Republican People's Party (Turkey) politicians
Deputies of Kırklareli
Deputies of Istanbul
Ottoman Army officers
Turkish Army generals
Ottoman military personnel of the Balkan Wars
Ottoman military personnel of World War I
Turkish military personnel of the Greco-Turkish War (1919–1922)
Ottoman Military Academy alumni
Ottoman Military College alumni
Recipients of the Medal of Independence with Red Ribbon (Turkey)
Burials at Turkish State Cemetery